Kněžice is a municipality and village in Nymburk District in the Central Bohemian Region of the Czech Republic. It has about 500 inhabitants.

Administrative parts
Villages of Dubečno and Osek are administrative parts of Kněžice.

History
The first written mention of Kněžice is from 1295.

Gallery

References

Villages in Nymburk District